Eugoa tessellata is a moth of the family Erebidae first described by Jeremy Daniel Holloway in 2001. It is found on Borneo. The habitat consists of lowland forests.

The length of the forewings is 11 mm. Both the forewings and hindwings are pale creamy fawn.

References

Moths described in 2001
tessellata